Martín Rodríguez Gurruchaga (born 4 December 1985 in Rosario) is an Argentine rugby union footballer, currently with the Paris Top 14 club Stade Français. He plays in both the fullback and centre positions. His test debut for Argentina was against England at Twickenham in November 2009. In May 2010 Rodríguez was selected in a squad of over 40 players to represent Argentina in the two test Summer tour of Argentina.

References

scrum.com

External links
scrum.com
zimbio.com

1985 births
Living people
Argentine rugby union players
Argentina international rugby union players
Stade Français players
Pampas XV players
Sportspeople from Rosario, Santa Fe
Argentina international rugby sevens players